Artyom Vadimovich Roshchin (born 12 January 1993) is a Russian football forward.

Club career
He made his debut in the Russian Second Division for FC Volga Tver on 23 July 2012 in a game against FC Tekstilshchik Ivanovo.

He made his Russian Football National League debut for FC Fakel Voronezh on 16 March 2016 in a game against FC Luch-Energiya Vladivostok.

References

External links
 
 
 Career summary by sportbox.ru

1993 births
People from Kimry
Living people
Russian footballers
Association football forwards
FC Fakel Voronezh players
Sportspeople from Tver Oblast